Cengiz Topel (September 2, 1934 – August 8, 1964) was a fighter pilot of the Turkish Air Force, who was tortured to death after his plane was shot down while supporting the Turkish army  during the 1964 inter-communal conflict "Erenköy Resistance", known as the Battle of Tylliria in Greek Cypriot parlance.

Career
Topel was born in İzmit on September 2, 1934, to Hakkı Bey, a tobacco expert from Trabzon and Mebuse Hanım in İzmit, where his father was working for the Turkish tobacco company Tekel. He was the third sibling of four children.

Cengiz Topel was schooled in Bandırma and Gönen of Balıkesir Province. He finished the primary and the secondary school in Kadıköy, İstanbul, where his family moved following his father's death. After a brief time at Haydarpaşa High School, he entered Kuleli Military High School, from which he graduated in 1953. Cengiz Topel joined the Army in 1955 with the rank of a second lieutenant following his education at the Turkish Military Academy.

His interest in aviation took him to the Turkish Air Force. He was sent to Canada for flight training. In 1957, he returned to Turkey and was appointed to the 5th Air Wing in Merzifon Air Base. Cengiz Topel served from 1961 on at the 1st Tactical Air Force Command at Eskişehir Air Base. In 1963, he became an Air Force captain.

Combat mission
On August 8, 1964, Topel was appointed to a combat mission during Turkey's military intervention during the Battle of Tylliria. He led a four-fighter flight of the 112th Air Squadron leaving Eskişehir Air Base around 17:00 local time for Cyprus. Topel's F-100 Super Sabre was hit by 40mm anti-aircraft fire from a Greek Cypriot gun emplacement and shot-down as he was strafing the Arion, a Greek Cypriot patrol boat. He was able to eject from his aircraft and made a safe parachute jump over land. He was promptly captured and brought to a hospital. However, in violation of the Geneva Conventions, members of the Cyprus National Guard allegedly took him from the hospital to their headquarters at Kykkos Monastery. An autopsy of his body showed that he was heavily tortured and his corpse was shot afterwards. In detail: One of his eyes was gouged out, a metal construction nail was hammered in his skull, in his both arms were holes drilled, his testicles were smashed, his legs were broken. Some of his inner organs had been robbed. He suffered unimaginable pain till he was shot and murdered.  

His corpse was returned on August 12, 1964, to the Turkish authorities only after insistent attempts. On August 14, 1964, he was laid to rest at the Edirnekapı Martyr's Cemetery in Istanbul.

He is known as the first Turkish pilot to be killed in action.

Legacy
A former Turkish Air Force base located near İzmit, currently in use as Cengiz Topel Naval Air Station, is named after him. A monument was erected on the coastal road in the village Gemikonağı near Lefke in Northern Cyprus, where he had landed by parachute. A bronze statue in Eskişehir depicts him in flight suit. A number of places, schools in Turkey and a hospital in Northern Cyprus are named after him.

References

People from İzmit
1934 births
1964 deaths
Haydarpaşa High School alumni
Kuleli Military High School alumni
Turkish Military Academy alumni
Turkish aviators
Turkish Air Force officers
Turkish military personnel of the Cyprus conflicts
Shot-down aviators
Turkish prisoners of war
Burials at Edirnekapı Martyr's Cemetery
Turkish torture victims
Turkish military personnel killed in action
Deaths by firearm in Cyprus